The 1979 NHL Expansion Draft was held on June 13, 1979.  The draft took place to fill the rosters of the National Hockey League's new teams for the 1979–80 season: the Edmonton Oilers, Hartford Whalers, Quebec Nordiques and Winnipeg Jets. These four teams had joined the NHL after a merger agreement was reached with the World Hockey Association (WHA).

As many WHA players also had their rights held by NHL teams, those NHL teams were allowed to reclaim their players. In order to keep the NHL teams from plundering all the talent from the WHA-turned-NHL teams, each incoming franchise was allowed to protect up to two goaltenders and two skaters. These were designated as "priority selections" in the Expansion Draft.

WHA Dispersal Draft
Following the 1978–79 WHA season, and prior to the NHL reclaiming players, the WHA dispersed players whose rights were held by teams not accepted into the NHL: the Birmingham Bulls and Cincinnati Stingers, and the Indianapolis Racers, who had folded during the previous season. Players that were twenty years old or younger were available to all 21 NHL teams in the entry draft, and the remaining players were made available to the four merging teams from the WHA. Before their final season the WHA opted not to have an amateur draft and instead encouraged their teams to sign underage players. Seven Birmingham Bulls were drafted in the 1979 NHL Entry Draft: Rob Ramage (1st), Rick Vaive (5th), Craig Hartsburg (6th), Michel Goulet (20th), Gaston Gingras (27th), Pat Riggin (33rd), and Keith Crowder (57th). Crowder began the season as a Bull but returned to the Peterborough Petes after just five games. The Cincinnati Stingers used two who were drafted: Mike Gartner (4th) and Mark Messier (48th). Messier was underage but was eligible for the 1979 draft due to his WHA service time. The Winnipeg Jets used John Gibson (71st), but only on a ten game tryout contract in March 1979 but was returned to the Niagara Falls Flyers before the end of the season.

Expansion draft rules
Reclaiming of players: The 17 existing NHL teams were allowed to reclaim any rights to former WHA players they held.  The four incoming franchises, however, were allowed to protect up to two goaltenders and two skaters, voiding their NHL rights.  These players were considered "priority selections" in the expansion draft.  Numerous deals were cut by the incoming teams to retain some of their players.  For instance, Quebec retained star forward Real Cloutier by trading a first-round draft choice to the Chicago Black Hawks, which held Cloutier's rights; that pick was used to select perennial superstar Denis Savard.

Wayne Gretzky was a special case - although no team held his NHL rights, under existing rules he would have been removed from the Oilers and placed into the NHL Entry Draft.  However, Gretzky had been signed by Oilers owner Peter Pocklington to a personal services contract instead of a standard player contract.  Confronted with the probability of being drafted first overall by the last place Colorado Rockies, Gretzky refused to void his contract with Pocklington.  After deliberation, the Oilers were allowed to keep Gretzky as one of their priority selections, and agreed to choose last in each round of the 1979 NHL Entry Draft as further compensation.

Gordie Howe was a second special case - as a gentlemen's agreement between the Hartford Whalers and the Detroit Red Wings, which held his NHL rights, the Red Wings declined to reclaim the 51-year-old Howe.

Expansion draft: Each of the 17 existing NHL teams were allowed to protect 15 skaters and two veteran goalies.

Compensation: The 17 existing NHL teams received $125,000 for each player drafted, these payments being funded by the $6 million in franchise fees each of the former WHA teams paid to join the NHL.

Reclaimed players
These are players whose NHL rights were reclaimed when the WHA merged with the NHL.

Twelve additional players were reclaimed, but were chosen as 'Priority Selections' by the four merging franchises

Expansion draft results

Priority selections

These players were "priority selections" in the 1979 NHL Expansion Draft.

1 The NHL denied the Oilers' claim of Bengt-Ake Gustafsson. League president John Ziegler ruled that the Oilers violated WHA rules when they attempted to add Gustafsson to their team during the 1979 playoffs, so they voided any claim on him.

The following are the players selected in the 1979 NHL Expansion Draft

Hartford Whalers selections

Winnipeg Jets selections

Quebec Nordiques selections

Edmonton Oilers selections

Both Reg Thomas and Dave Hunter are described as being taken in this draft, however in Greig's detailed lists they are both part of the "Pre–draft Roster."

See also
1978–79 WHA season
1979 NHL Entry Draft
1979–80 NHL season

Citations

References
Hartford/New England Whalers All-Time Roster
WHA Oilers Page - 1979 Expansion Draft (webarchive.org 29 November 2003)
Washington Capitals History 1979-1980
St. Louis Blues Team Records
Foundation Begins with Goaltending by Al Morganti @ ESPN.com

Draft
Expansion Draft
Expansion Draft
Expansion Draft
Expansion Draft
National Hockey League expansion drafts
Winnipeg Jets (1972–1996)